Dinesh Chandra may refer to:
Dinesh Chandra (politician), leader of the Bahujan Samaj Party in Uttar Pradesh
Dinesh Chandra Bhandary (born 1934), Indian air force officer
Dinesh Chandra Gorai (born 1934), Bishop of Calcutta
Dinesh Chandra Goswami (born 1949), Assamese writer
Dinesh Chandra Joarder (1928–2018), Indian politician
Dinesh Chandra Sen (1866–1939), Bengali writer
Dinesh Chandra Sinha (born 1935), Indian academic
Dinesh Chandra Yadav (born 1951), Indian politician
Dinesh Chandra Yadav (Nepal), Nepalese politician
Dinesh Goswami (1935–1991), Indian politician